Rukmangada or Rukmangad is a mythological king in the Hindu sacred books. He was said to be a great devotee of Vishnu. He is also seen as a pious king and an example of how to perform one's duties, as he was willing to kill his own son rather than break his observance of Ekadasi. Vaikuntha Ekadasi is celebrated in honor of his actions.

Legend
Rukmangada was happily married to Sandhyavali and the couple had a small son named Dharmangada or Dharmangad. As a devotee of Vishnu, Rukmangada was very particular about observing the Ekadasi, a day sacred to Vishnu, as a day of fasting, prayer, and abstinence.

The Gods decide to test Rukmangada's faith by sending Mohini, an apsara or celestial enchantress, to beguile him. Mohini succeeds in her mission; upon first sight, the king is utterly bewitched by her beauty. A courtship ensues and Mohini extracts promises from the king to the effect that she will stay with him only as long as he grants her every wish and never opposes her. In particular, she makes him promise that since Rukmangada was ardently seeking her favor, he must never rebuff her when she makes advances to him in the future. Under these conditions, Mohini becomes Rukmangada's unlawful lover. The virtuous Sandhyavali swallows her pride and receives Mohini into the palace.

The Test 
On the day of Ekadasi, Rukmangada's devotion to Vishnu is tested. As usual, Rukmangada takes a ritual bath, anoints himself with the Kumkuma-chandanam (vermilion and sandalwood) pastes sacred to Vishnu, and sits down for his pooja before the idol of Vishnu to spend the day in prayer, meditation, and fasting. Mohini chooses this time to approach Rugmangada and caress him. He rebuffs her with a reproach about the untimeliness of the advance. Mohini declares herself offended, reminds him of his promise, and demands its immediate fulfillment: Rukmangada must accompany her to the inner chambers immediately. Rukmangada is horrified, and words are exchanged; Mohini accuses Rukmangada of having beguiled her and ruined her virtue without being actually in love with her. Mohini presents Rukmangada with a horrific ultimatum: she will release him from his promise and leave his kingdom forever, but only if Rukmangada slays his only child, Dharmangada, as penance for ruining her.

After much mental agony, Rukmangada decides that he would rather kill his son than break the observance of Ekadasi and thus compromise his devotions to Vishnu. The distraught but unwaveringly devoted Sandhyavali acquiesces to this decision. Just as Rukmangada is about to strike off his son's head, Vishnu appears before them, pleased. Vishnu reveals that Mohini is an apsara, sent to test Rukmangada's devotion, and that he has passed the test. Dharmangada is crowned king. Vishnu takes Rukmangada and his pious wife Sandhyavali away to his heavenly abode, Vaikuntha.

Related legend
King Rukmangada once visited the ashram of Rishi Vachaknavi. Here he met Mukunda, the wife of an ascetic. Mukunda was attracted to the king but he spurned her; in response she cursed him to be stricken by leprosy. Later, Rukmangada's leprosy was cured by bathing at the Kadamba pond.

Lord Indra had been attracted by Mukunda's beauty. Taking advantage of her attraction for Rukmangada, Indra approached Mukunda disguised as Rukmangada. Taken in by the ruse, Mukunda compromised herself. Their union led to the birth of a son whom she named Gruthsmadh. In due course, Gruthsmadh grew up and discovered the events leading to his birth. He berated his mother and retired to the Bhadraka forest for meditation. This forest is today called Mahad. Gruthsmadh prayed to Lord Vinayaka to purge him of the sin that his birth entailed, and his wish was granted. The place where Lord Vinayaka appeared before Gruthsmadh to grant this boon is the site of the Varadavinayaka temple.

References

Characters in Hindu mythology